The 2003 Ottawa municipal election was a municipal election that was held in Ottawa to elect the city's mayor, City Council, and school trustees for the city of Ottawa, Ontario, Canada. The vote was held on November 10, 2003. The elections were held simultaneously with most other municipalities in Ontario.

The mayoral election was won by popular incumbent and former Liberal Member of Provincial Parliament Bob Chiarelli. His main competition was that of right-wing candidate Terry Kilrea.

Issues
The main issues of the race were a controversial Smoking ban, the expansion of the O-Train (Ottawa's light rail system), official bilingualism and the recent amalgamation. Chiarelli was in favour of the smoking ban, which had been implemented by the last city council. The ban was on smoking in all public places, which angered many bar and restaurant owners.  Kilrea was against the smoking ban. He was also against putting money into expanding the O-Train, and official bilingualism in the city.

Controversy
One of the prominent fringe candidates for mayor was associated with white supremacist support. Donna Upson received contributions from the Ku Klux Klan, and she voiced support for racial segregation. She has also set up a Canadian branch of the National Socialist Movement. She finished in sixth place with 1,312 votes (0.71%).

Turnout
Turnout for the election was low, at 33%. The highest turnouts were in the rural areas, specifically in Goulbourn, Rideau and the highest West Carleton (45%). The lowest turnout was in Somerset Ward at 25% turnout.

Results for mayor

Chiarelli won all but three wards and had his most strength in the city core region. Kilrea won three wards, all in the rural south and west.

Council results

No incumbents lost any races, and only two councillors had a decrease in the popular vote percentage from the 2000 election.

Orléans Ward
Herb Kreling 7,182 (72.89%) (+31.93%)
Louise Malloy 2,671 (27.11%)

Innes Ward
Rainer Bloess 5,925 (59.26%) (+7.25%)
J.-F. Claude 4,073 (40.74%)

Bell-South Nepean Ward
Jan Harder 11,678 (86.75%) (+25.86%)
John R. Palmer 1,784 (13.25%)

Kanata Ward
Peggy Feltmate 12,260 (70.58%)
Richard Rutkowski 4,166 (23.98%)
Donald Leafloor 561 (3.23%)
Grant Johnston 384 (2.21%)

West Carleton Ward
Eli El-Chantiry 2,738 (44.61%)
Adele Muldoon 2,709 (44.14%)
Daryl W. Craig 480 (7.82%)
Jim Jenkins 210 (3.42%)

Goulbourn Ward
Janet Stavinga 5,076 (64.15%) (+19.14%)
Michael P. O'Rourke 2,837 (35.85%)

Bay Ward
Alex Cullen 6,713 (56.74%) (+8.72%)
John Blatherwick 4,477 (37.84%)
Don Rivington 394 (3.33%)
Didar Mohamed 248 (2.10%)

Baseline Ward
Rick Chiarelli (acclaimed)

Knoxdale-Merivale Ward
Gord Hunter 7,029 (84.79%) (+13.17%)
Phillip Unhola 637 (7.68%)
Al Speyers 624 (7.53%) (-20.85%)

Gloucester-Southgate Ward
Diane Deans 6,166 (59.34%) (+10.64%)
Harold G. Keenan 3,917 (37.70%)
David Lamothe 308 (2.96%)

Beacon Hill-Cyrville Ward
Michel Bellemare 4,613 (61.04%) (+3.17%)
Frank Reid 2,812 (37.21%)
Osman Abdi 132 (1.75%)

Rideau-Vanier Ward
Georges Bédard 3,631 (41.52%)
Bruce McConville 2,355 (26.93%)
Angela Rickman 1,829 (20.91%)
Giacomo Vigna 582 (6.66%)
Abdillahi Omar Bouh 211 (2.41%)
Natasha Duckworth 137 (1.57%)

Rideau-Rockcliffe Ward
Jacques Legendre 6,070 (79.17%) (+15.29%)
James Parker 934 (12.18%)
Michel Binda 663 (8.65%)

Somerset Ward
Diane Holmes 4,105 (61.62%)
Dawn Pickering 1,195 (17.94%)
David MacDonald 567 (8.51%)
William A. Ostapyk 366 (5.49%)
Steve Sweeney 189 (2.84%)
Sotos Petrides 132 (1.98%)
Bill Driver 55 (0.83%)
Mike Jung 53 (0.80%)

Kitchissippi Ward
Shawn Little 2,907 (27.12%) (-19.92%)
Kris Klein 2,330 (21.74%)
Gary Ludington 2,217 (20.68%)
Linda Davis 1,540 (14.37%) (-26.07%)
Daniel Stringer 1,058 (9.87%)
David McConnell 625 (5.83%)
Les Gangé 42 (0.39%)

River Ward
Maria McRae 5,600 (63.11%)
Todd Mattila-Hartman 1,654 (18.64%)
Richard Smith 1,619 (18.25%)

Capital Ward
Clive Doucet 5,785 (80.06%) (+9.67%)
C.R.L. Erickson 1,024 (14.17%)
Mike Salmon 417 (5.77%)

Alta Vista Ward
Peter Hume (acclaimed)

Cumberland Ward
Rob Jellett 2,957 (54.37%)
Garry Lowe 1,871 (34.40%)
Pierre E. Doucette 552 (10.15%)
David Whissell  59 (1.08%)

Osgoode Ward
Doug Thompson (acclaimed)

Rideau Ward
Glenn Brooks 2,765 (62.68%) (-2.42%)
Paul Paton 1,646 (37.32%)

School trustee races

Ottawa-Carleton District School Board Trustees

Ottawa-Carleton Catholic School Board Trustees

Conseil des écoles catholiques de langue française du Centre-Est Trustees

Conseil des écoles publiques de l'Est de l'Ontario Trustees

Information on the candidates
Giacomo Vigna (Rideau-Vanier ward) is a lawyer with the Canadian Human Rights Commission. He was a candidate in the 1991 Ottawa municipal election, though he withdrew from the contest before election day. In 1994, he ran for a seat on the Saint-Leonard city council in suburban Montreal and narrowly lost to incumbent Robert Zambito. In the 2003 election, he focused on economic development issues and called for an expansion of the Ottawa Congress Centre. Vigna has argued cases before the Canadian Human Rights Tribunal against persons accused of online hate speech. In 2010, he won a libel suit against right-wing pundit Ezra Levant; a judge ruled that Levant had libelled Vigna with "reckless indifference" to the truth in various blog posts.

References

External links
2003 Municipal Election Results

Municipal elections in Ottawa
2003 Ontario municipal elections
election, 2003